Dan Jenson (born 20 June 1975 in Brisbane, Australia) is a professional squash player from Australia. He joined the professional tour in 1993, and reached a career-high world ranking of World No. 5 in 1999. He was considered to be one of the rising stars of the game in the late-1990s, but a series of injuries hampered his progress.

At the inaugural World Doubles Squash Championships in 1997, Jenson won the mixed doubles event (partnering Liz Irving), and finished runner-up in the men's doubles (partnering Craig Rowland). He was also runner-up in the men's doubles at the 2006 championships (partnering Joe Kneipp). At the 2006 Commonwealth Games, Jenson won a Bronze Medal in the men's doubles (partnering David Palmer).

References

External links 

1975 births
Living people
Australian male squash players
Commonwealth Games bronze medallists for Australia
Commonwealth Games medallists in squash
Squash players at the 2006 Commonwealth Games
Sportsmen from Queensland
Sportspeople from Brisbane
20th-century Australian people
21st-century Australian people
Medallists at the 2006 Commonwealth Games